Charles Hoare may refer to:
C. A. R. Hoare (born 1934), British computer scientist
Charles Hoare (cricketer, born 1847) (1847–1908), English cricketer and banker
Charles Hoare (cricketer, born 1851) (1851–1935), English cricketer
Charles Hoare (cricketer, born 1819) (1819–1869), English cricketer
Charles Hoare of the Hoare baronets
Charles Hoare (priest) (1781–1865), evangelical Church of England clergyman, archdeacon of Surrey
Charles Hoare (banker) (1767–1851), senior partner of C. Hoare & Co